Prison Break is an American serial drama television series that premiered on the Fox network on August 29, 2005, and finished its fifth season on May 30, 2017. The series was simulcast on Global in Canada, and broadcast in dozens of countries worldwide. Prison Break is produced by Adelstein-Parouse Productions, in association with Rat Television, Original Television and Twentieth Century Fox Television. The series revolves around two brothers: Michael Scofield (Wentworth Miller) and Lincoln Burrows (Dominic Purcell). In the first season, Lincoln is sentenced to death for a crime he did not commit, and Michael deliberately incarcerates himself to help him escape prison. Season two focuses on the manhunt of the prison escapees, season three revolves around Michael's breakout from a Panamanian jail, the fourth season unravels the criminal conspiracy that imprisoned Lincoln, and the fifth season focuses on breaking Michael out of a prison in Yemen and uncovering the conspiracy that forced Michael to fake his death and change his identity.

A total of 90 episodes of Prison Break have been aired, in addition to three special making-of episodes. The first season aired from August 29, 2005 to May 15, 2006, with a four-month break after Thanksgiving. The second season, which premiered on August 21, 2006, had a similar schedule as the first, although it had a shorter break. After an eight-week hiatus, the second season resumed on January 22, 2007 before ending on April 2, 2007. The third season began on September 17, 2007, with an eight-episode run. The show's third season went on hiatus over the 2007 Christmas period because of the 2007–2008 Writers Guild of America strike. It resumed on January 14, 2008, and the last five episodes of the season were aired. The fourth season, consisting of 22 episodes, began airing in September 2008, stopped in December 2008, and resumed on April 17, 2009. After being in development for several months, Fox announced in January 2016 that it had ordered a limited event series that would serve as a continuation to the original series. The season premiered on April 4, 2017, on Fox.

The first five seasons of Prison Break have been released on DVD and Blu-ray in Regions 1, 2, and 4. Each DVD boxed set includes all of the broadcast episodes from that season, the associated special episode, commentary from cast and crew, and profiles of various parts of Prison Break, such as Fox River State Penitentiary or the tattoo. Prison Break is also available online, including iTunes, Amazon Video, and Netflix. After the premiere of the second season of Prison Break, Fox began online streaming of the prior week's episode, though it originally restricted viewing to the United States.

Series overview

Episodes

Season 1 (2005–06)

Season 2 (2006–07)

Season 3 (2007–08)

Season 4 (2008–09)

Season 5 (2017)

Specials

Ratings

Notes

References

External links
 

Lists of American crime drama television series episodes

it:Prison Break#Episodi